The 2014 European Cadet Judo Championships is an edition of the European Cadet Judo Championships, organised by the International Judo Federation. It was held in Athens, Greece from 4 to 6 July 2014.

Medal summary

Medal table

Men's events

Women's events

Source Results

References

External links
 

 U18
European Cadet Judo Championships
European Championships, U18
Judo
Judo competitions in Greece
Judo
Judo, European Championships U18